A computer simulation language is used to describe the operation of a simulation on a computer. There are two major types of simulation: continuous and discrete event though more modern languages can handle more complex combinations.  Most languages also have a graphical interface and at least a simple statistic gathering capability for the analysis of the results. An important part of discrete-event languages is the ability to generate pseudo-random numbers and variants from different probability distributions.

See also
 Discrete event simulation
 List of computer simulation software

References

Simulation programming languages
Stochastic simulation